Consort Yun or Queen Yun may refer to:

Korea
Hui-bi Yun (died 1380), wife of Chunghye of Goryeo 
Queen Jeonghui (1418–1483), consort of Sejo of Joseon
Deposed Queen Yun (1455–1482), second wife of Seongjong of Joseon
Queen Jeonghyeon (1462–1530), third wife of Seongjong of Joseon
Queen Janggyeong (Joseon) (1491–1515), second queen of Jungjong of Joseon
Queen Munjeong (1501–1565), third queen of Jungjong of Joseon
Crown Princess Gonghoebin (1553–1592), wife of Crown Prince Sunhoe
Royal Noble Consort Hwabin Yun (1765–1824), concubine of Jeongjo of Joseon
Empress Sunjeonghyo (1894–1966), wife of Emperor Yunghui

China
Concubine Yun (Qing dynasty) (died 1856), concubine of the Xianfeng Emperor